British composer Harriet Maitland Young (1838 – 1923) wrote songs, operettas, and instrumental music. Her operetta An Artist's Proof was performed in Brighton, England, on 4 February 1882. Her operetta The Queen of Hearts was performed in Dartford, England, in 1888. She was buried in Camden, London, England.

Young's compositions include:

Operetta 

An Artist's Proof (1882)
(The) Holy Branch (also seen as The Holly Branch)
Queen of Hearts (1888)
When One Door Shuts

Vocal 
Ah! Si Vous Saviez
Bella Pescatorina
Golden Days and Silvery Nights
In Sunny Spain (women's choir and piano)
La Mia Bella
Lullaby (voice and cello)
Out of Reach
Secret is My Own
Where the Roses Are (duet)

References

1838 births
1923 deaths
British composers
British women composers
English songwriters
Operetta composers